The Network Development Plan Metropolitan Rail was a long-term development plan for the rail network of Melbourne, Australia. It was written by Public Transport Victoria (PTV) and released to the public on 27 March 2013 under the Napthine government and received minor updates in 2016.

Similar plans were intended to be released for regional rail, trams and buses. However, only the metropolitan rail aspect of the plan was released to the public by PTV. The Regional Network Development Plan was released by the Victorian Department of Transport in 2016. 

The primary aim of the metropolitan rail plan was to improve the efficiency, reliability and patronage of Melbourne's train network and transition it towards a rapid transit system. It set out a number of goals over four stages, to be carried out over 20 years. Then-CEO of PTV Ian Dobbs estimated the whole plan would cost about $30 billion.

In 2019 PTV was abolished as an independent, statutory government body and absorbed into the Victorian Department of Transport. The plan was influential on Melbourne's transport planning but does not represent current government policy.

Background
The Public Transport Development Authority, later trading as Public Transport Victoria, was established by the Victorian government under Premier Ted Baillieu with the intent of, among other things, planning and improving the operations of the rail network.

Plan

Stage 1: (Timeline 2012 - 2016)
This stage outlined immediate high priority goals to overcome urgent constraints, with a targeted completion date of 2016. All projects listed in Stage 1 had been completed in 2022.

Stage 2: (Timeline 2016 - 2022) 
The second stage focused on creating a "metro-style" system by segregating operations and creating end-to-end lines, with a targeted completion date of 2022.

Stage 3: (Timeline 2022 - 2027) 
This stage focuses on extending the network to growth areas and suburbs without railway access, and utilising the preceding growth in capacity. It is to be completed within 15 years, before 2027.

Most projects are planned to happen in the next decade. Some have been deferred or/and replaced by other means (eg. Rowville heavy rail → light rail, Doncaster heavy rail → busway). Implementation of HCS across the network is unknown.

Stage 4: (Timeline 2027 - 2032) 
The final stage involves further utilisation of extra capacity and preparing for future growth in Melbourne. The stage is to be carried out within 20 years, before 2032.

The reconfiguration of the metropolitan rail network will create seven independently operated lines similar to other rapid transit systems

Some projects listed are planned to be completed in the next decade but are still in their early stages.  most details about these projects are still unknown.

Reception and legacy

2018 Transport for Victoria plan
In October 2018, a Victorian Rail Plan prepared by Transport for Victoria (TFV) was leaked to the press, containing a similar staged approach to the PTV NDMPR. The plan, released during the campaign for that year's state election, caused some controversy, as government policy announcements did not align with the strategic priorities identified in the plan. The Suburban Rail Loop, in particular, did not appear, and the TFV plan was further criticised for failing to prioritise meaningful service increases for regional corridors in the earlier stages of the plan. Government representatives argued that the plan was an "internal working document" and not representative of government policy; Opposition politicians contended that the plan was representative of the government's priorities.

Metro Tunnel Day One
The first stage of the TFV plan had an intended completion date of 2025, aligning with the start of service on the Metro Tunnel. Some of the projects are under construction.

Stage 3

Stage 4
The revised plan doesn't have a projected completion dates for stages 3–6.

Stage 5

Stage 6

See also
Victorian Transport Plan
List of Victoria Government Infrastructure Plans, Proposals and Studies

References

External links
Official website

Public transport in Melbourne